Elsa Viveca Torstensdotter Lindfors (December 29, 1920 – October 25, 1995) was a Swedish American stage, film, and television actress. She won an Emmy Award and a Silver Bear for Best Actress.

Biography
Lindfors was born in Uppsala, Sweden, the daughter of Karin Emilia Therese (née Dymling) and Axel Torsten Lindfors.

She trained at the Royal Dramatic Training Academy, Stockholm. Soon after, she became a theater and film star in Sweden. She moved to the United States in 1946 after being signed by Warner Bros., and began working in Hollywood. She appeared in more than 100 films, including Night Unto Night, No Sad Songs for Me, Dark City, The Halliday Brand, King of Kings, An Affair of the Skin, Creepshow, The Sure Thing, and Stargate. She appeared with actors including Ronald Reagan, Jeffrey Hunter, Charlton Heston, Glenn Ford, Lizabeth Scott, and Errol Flynn.

In 1952, she appeared on Broadway alongside Edmond O'Brien in John Van Druten's I've Got Sixpence. Two years later, she made her West End debut in J. B. Priestley's poorly received play The White Countess.

Lindfors appeared frequently on television, usually as a guest star, though she played the title role in the miniseries Frankenstein's Aunt. Most of her TV appearances were in the 1950s and 1960s, with a resurgence in the 1980s and early 1990s. In 1990, she won an Emmy Award for her guest appearance on the series Life Goes On. She was nominated for an Emmy in 1978 for her supporting role in the TV movie A Question of Guilt.

In 1962, she shared the Silver Bear for Best Actress award with Rita Gam at the Berlin Film Festival, for their performances in Tad Danielewski's No Exit. Among her later film roles, perhaps the most memorable is the kindly and worldly wise Professor Taub in The Sure Thing (1985).

In the last years of her life, she taught acting at the School of Visual Arts in  Manhattan, and had a lead role (essentially playing herself) in Henry Jaglom's Last Summer in the Hamptons (1995). The same year, she returned to the Strindberg Festival in Stockholm to perform in the play In Search of Strindberg.

Personal life
Lindfors was married four times, to Swedish cinematographer Harry Hasso,  Swedish attorney and World Chess Federation president Folke Rogard, director Don Siegel, and Hungarian writer, producer, and director George Tabori. She had three children – two sons (John Tabori with Hasso, and  actor Kristoffer Tabori, with Siegel) and a daughter (Lena Tabori, with Rogard).

Lindfors was a naturalized U.S. citizen and a liberal Democrat, who supported the presidency of Jimmy Carter.
 
Viveca Lindfors died from complications of rheumatoid arthritis at the age of 74 in Uppsala, and was buried at Uppsala Gamla cemetery.

Selected filmography

Major stage appearances

References

Further reading

External links

 
 
 
 Viveca Lindfors at the University of Wisconsin's Actors Studio audio collection
 Edward Winter, The FIDE President and the Actress, ChessBase.com; retrieved 2009-01-20.
 Photographs and literature
 Viveca Lindfors papers, 1945–1990, held by the Billy Rose Theatre Division, New York Public Library for the Performing Arts

1920 births
1995 deaths
20th-century American actresses
20th-century American singers
20th-century American women singers
American film actresses
American stage actresses
American television actresses
American women academics
California Democrats
Deaths from arthritis
Emmy Award winners
Naturalized citizens of the United States
People from Uppsala
School of Visual Arts faculty
Silver Bear for Best Actress winners
Sundance Film Festival award winners
Swedish emigrants to the United States
Swedish women singers
Swedish film actresses
Swedish stage actresses
20th-century Swedish women